Cercle et Carré (Circle and Square) was a group of abstract artists in Paris, founded 1929 by Joaquín Torres García and Michel Seuphor. The group published a journal with the same name. In 1930 they organised an exhibition in Paris showing 130 abstract works by various artists.  "Notre programme fût "Construction", fusse figuratif ou non-figuratif" ( Our formula was "Construccion" whether it was figurative or non-figurative). When the Abstraction-Création was founded in 1931 it absorbed the group.

From 1936 Joaquín Torres García continued publication of the journal from Montevideo in Spanish and French with the title Círculo y Cuadrado "La seconde epoque de "Cercle et Carre" (Circle and Square, the second period) with the same logo. From abroad artists sent letters and articles to be published: Jean Hélion, Piet Mondrian, Umberto Boccioni, etc.

1930 Exhibition
April 1930 the group opened an exhibition in Galerie 23 at Rue La Boétie with works by Hans Arp, Willi Baumeister, Ingibjörg Stein H. Bjarnason Carl Buchheister, Marcelle Cahn Francisca Clausen, Jaime A. Colson, Germán Cueto Serge Charchoune, Pierre Daura, Alexander Exter, Fillia, François Foltyn, Jean Gorin, Wanda Chodasiewicz-Grabowska, Huib Hoste, Vilmos Huszar, Vera Idelson, Wassily Kandinsky, Luc Lafnet, Le Corbusier, Fernand Léger, Oscar Luethy, Piet Mondrian, Stefan Moszczynski, Erik Olson, Amédée Ozenfant, Antoine Pevsner, Enrico Prampolini, Luigi Russolo, Alberto Sartoris, Kurt Schwitters, Henri Stazewski, Hechama Szmuszkowicz, Joseph Stella, Hans Suschny, Sophie Taeuber-Arp, Joaquín Torres-García, Vordemberge-Gildewart, Adya Van Rees, Otto van Rees (artist), Georges Vantongerloo, Hans Welti, H.N.Werkman, Wanda Wolska.

List of issues

Cercle et Carré
Published in Paris, 1930 Círculo y Cuadrado, accessdate=19 Mar 2012
 No. 1 – 15 March 1930
 No. 2 – 15 April 1930
 No. 3 – June 1930

Círculo y Cuadrado
Published in Montevideo, 1936-1943 Círculo y Cuadrado, accessdate=20 Mar 2012 List of Montevideo issues at Publicaciones Periódicas del Uruguay (issues available as PDF's)

 No. 1 – May 1936
 No. 2 – August 1936
 No. 3 – February 1937
 No. 4 – May 1937
 No. 5 – September 1937
 No. 6 – March 1938
 No. 7 – September 1938
 No. 8, 9 & 10 – September 1943

Notes and references

Modernism
French artist groups and collectives